Robert A. Sedler is an American retired law professor and attorney, who taught at Wayne State University Law School for over 40 years, specializing in Constitutional law. Sedler began teaching at Wayne Law in 1977, prior to which he was a professor at the University of Kentucky College of Law. Sedler retired in December 2020, after finishing the fall semester.

Life and career 
Sedler graduated from University of Pittsburgh in 1956, and later obtained a law degree from the University of Pittsburgh School of Law, in 1959.

Sedler taught law courses in Ethiopia at the former Haile Sellasie I University (now Addis Ababa University), Faculty of Law in the 1960s. Sedler worked with the American Civil Liberties Union (ACLU) in Kentucky starting in the 1960s, serving as the ACLU of Kentucky's first general counsel, from 1967 to 1975. While with the ACLU, Sedler opposed racial segregation and challenges to the First Amendment.

Sedler has written dozens of essays on First Amendment and civil rights jurisprudence. Sedler also has written two books and dozens of articles on Ethiopian law. He has authored one textbook, Constitutional Law in the United States, and a book on conflict of laws, Across State Lines.

References 

Year of birth missing (living people)
Living people
University of Pittsburgh School of Law alumni
University of Pittsburgh alumni
American legal scholars
Wayne State University faculty
Conflict of laws scholars